Perrotin is a crater in the Coprates quadrangle of Mars, located at 2.82°S latitude and 77.94°W longitude.  It is 82.82 km in diameter and was named after Henri A. Perrotin, a French astronomer who studied dark lineations on the planet. Its name was approved in 1988.

See also 
 List of craters on Mars: O-Z

References

External links

Impact craters on Mars
Coprates quadrangle